Dulari Devi may refer to:
 Dulari Devi (politician)
 Dulari Devi (artist)

See also
 Dulari Devi Khatweni, Nepali politician